Fergus County is a county in the U.S. state of Montana. As of the 2020 census, the population was 11,446. Its county seat is Lewistown. The county was founded in 1885 and named for James Fergus, a Montana politician who was instrumental in creating the county.

Geography

Adjacent counties

 Chouteau County – northwest
 Blaine County – north
 Phillips County – northeast
 Petroleum County – east
 Musselshell County – southeast
 Golden Valley County – south
 Wheatland County – southwest
 Judith Basin County – west

Major highways

  U.S. Highway 87
  U.S. Highway 191
  Montana Highway 3
  Montana Highway 80
  Montana Highway 81
  Montana Highway 200

National protected areas
 Charles M. Russell National Wildlife Refuge (part)
 Lewis and Clark National Forest (part)
 Upper Missouri River Breaks National Monument (part)

Military Installations
 LGM-30 Minuteman silos D-01 thru D-11 of the 10th Missile Squadron, 341st Missile Wing, 20th Air Force, assigned to Malmstrom AFB, Montana

Politics

Demographics

2000 census
As of the 2000 United States census, of 2000, there were 11,893 people, 4,860 households, and 3,197 families living in the county. The population density was 3 people per square mile (1/km2). There were 5,558 housing units at an average density of 1 per square mile (0/km2). The racial makeup of the county was 97.10% White, 1.18% Native American, 0.19% Asian, 0.29% from other races, 0.08% Black or African American, and 1.16% from two or more races. 0.81% of the population were Hispanic or Latino of any race. 24.5% were of German, 13.5% American, 13.0% Norwegian, 9.3% Irish and 9.0% English ancestry. 97.1% spoke English, 1.2% German, and 1.1% Spanish as their first language.

There were 4,860 households, out of which 28.70% had children under the age of 18 living with them, 56.10% were married couples living together, 6.70% had a female householder with no husband present, and 34.20% were non-families. 30.50% of all households were made up of individuals, and 13.90% had someone living alone who was 65 years of age or older. The average household size was 2.33 and the average family size was 2.91.

The county population contained 24.50% under the age of 18, 6.10% from 18 to 24, 23.60% from 25 to 44, 25.80% from 45 to 64, and 19.90% who were 65 years of age or older. The median age was 42 years. For every 100 females there were 94.80 males. For every 100 females age 18 and over, there were 93.40 males.

The median income for a household in the county was $30,409, and the median income for a family was $36,609. Males had a median income of $27,260 versus $18,138 for females. The per capita income for the county was $15,808. About 10.60% of families and 15.40% of the population were below the poverty line, including 19.40% of those under age 18 and 12.20% of those age 65 or over.

2010 census
As of the 2010 United States census, there were 11,586 people, 5,099 households, and 3,202 families living in the county. The racial makeup of the county was 96.6% white, 1.2% American Indian, 0.2% black or African American, 0.2% Asian, 0.2% from other races, and 1.5% from two or more races. Those of Hispanic or Latino origin made up 1.5% of the population. In terms of ancestry, 30.8% were German, 15.9% were English, 14.7% were Norwegian, 12.8% were Irish, and 4.2% were American.

Of the 5,099 households, 23.8% had children under the age of 18 living with them, 52.9% were married couples living together, 6.5% had a female householder with no husband present, 37.2% were non-families, and 32.6% of all households were made up of individuals. The average household size was 2.18 and the average family size was 2.75. The median age was 47.8 years.

The median income for a household in the county was $37,607 and the median income for a family was $48,623. Males had a median income of $35,110 versus $21,225 for females. The per capita income for the county was $22,295. About 12.5% of families and 14.7% of the population were below the poverty line, including 24.2% of those under age 18 and 9.3% of those age 65 or over.

Communities

City
 Lewistown (county seat)

Towns

 Denton
 Grass Range
 Moore
 Winifred

Unincorporated communities

 Amherst
 Buffalo
 Christina
 Eddies Corner
 Forest Grove
 Garneill
 Giltedge
 Hanover
 Heath
 Hoosac
 Maiden
 Moore
 Piper
 Roy
 Straw
 Valentine
 Ware

Former communities
Moulton

Census-designated places

 Ayers Ranch Colony
 Brooks
 Coffee Creek
 Danvers
 Deerfield Colony
 Fords Creek Colony
 Hilger
 King Ranch Colony
 Lewistown Heights
 Roy
 Spring Creek Colony
 Warm Spring Creek

Notable people
 Roy E. Ayers, member of the United States House of Representatives and 11th Governor of Montana; served as the attorney of the county from 1905 to 1909.
 Carl W. Riddick, House of Representatives from the Second District of Montana, served as County Assessor of Fergus County.

See also
 List of lakes in Fergus County, Montana
 List of mountains in Fergus County, Montana
 National Register of Historic Places listings in Fergus County, Montana

References

 
Montana counties on the Missouri River
1885 establishments in Montana Territory
Populated places established in 1885